Henry Roberts (1 September 1907 – October 1984) was an England international footballer who played at inside-right for Barrow, Chesterfield, Lincoln City, Port Vale, Millwall, Peterborough United, and Spalding United. He was capped by England despite never playing top-flight football and scored in his one and only international game, in a 4–1 win over Belgium on 16 May 1931.

Early and personal life
Henry Roberts was born in Barrow-in-Furness, Lancashire on 1 September 1907. He was the twelfth of thirteen children to Richard and Isabella; his father was a blacksmith on the shipyards.

Club career
Roberts represented Lancashire Schools and played junior football with Barrow Wireworks. He joined Barrow as a professional during Christmas 1925. On 1 July 1926, he signed with Chesterfield. On 11 August 1928, he joined Lincoln City. He was Lincoln's top-scorer in the 1929–30 season with 21 goals. He played on the losing side of the Lincolnshire Senior Cup final in 1929 and 1930. He was signed by Port Vale for a £100 fee on 20 June 1930. He was a first team regular at The Old Recreation Ground from December 1930, and managed a tally of 11 goals in 26 games as the "Valiants" finished a club record high of fifth in the Second Division in the 1930–31 season. He scored in both fixtures against Millwall, and was signed to the "Lions" on 30 April 1931.

Millwall finished ninth and seventh in the Second Division in 1931–32 and 1932–33, before suffering relegation with a 21st-place finish in 1933–34. They then finished 12th in the Third Division South in 1934–35. Roberts scored 25 goals in 115 league appearances at The Den. He was placed on the transfer list, and when the League Management Committee met on 28 June 1935, they decided that the 'fee asked for' was to be reduced. He signed with Sheffield Wednesday on 1 October 1935. He moved on to Midland League side Peterborough United in November 1935. He scored 29 goals for the "Posh" in 90 league and cup appearances, including a hat-trick in an 8–2 victory over Denaby United at London Road on 19 April 1938. He signed for Spalding United in the United Counties League on 17 August 1938.

International career
Roberts was capped by England in a friendly with Belgium at the Oscar Bossaert Stadium on 16 May 1931, which England won 4–1. He scored one of the goals, whilst Eric Houghton and Harry Burgess (2) bagged the other three. He was signed to Millwall at the time after having recently signed from Port Vale.

Career statistics
Source:

Honours
Lincoln City
Lincolnshire Senior Cup runner-up: 1929, 1930

References

Footballers from Barrow-in-Furness
Footballers from Cumbria
English footballers
England international footballers
Association football forwards
Barrow A.F.C. players
Chesterfield F.C. players
Lincoln City F.C. players
Port Vale F.C. players
Millwall F.C. players
Peterborough United F.C. players
Spalding United F.C. players
English Football League players
Midland Football League players
1907 births
1984 deaths